Alatau (Alatau; from Turkic languages: "motley mountain") is a town in Almaty Region, in south-eastern Kazakhstan, 15 km away from Almaty.

The town is notable for its Institute of Nuclear Physics, Kazakhstan National Nuclear Center (formerly of the Kazakh SSR Academy of Sciences), which houses an experimental nuclear reactor and cyclotron.

External links
Tageo.com

Populated places in Almaty Region